The Barbershop is an 1894 American short narrative film directed by William K.L. Dickson and William Heise. It was produced by the Edison Manufacturing Company at the Black Maria Studio, in West Orange, New Jersey. The film was one of the first created for the Kinetoscope.

Plot
In a barbershop, a barber gives a man an incredibly fast shave as two other men sit on each side of the chair.

References

External links
 
 

1894 films
1890s American films
American silent short films
American black-and-white films
Films shot in New Jersey
Films directed by William Kennedy Dickson
Films directed by William Heise
1894 short films